Mike Robinson, Jr. (born December 31, 1976) is a retired American professional basketball player and a high school basketball coach.   He played professionally for teams in the United States and Argentina.

Robinson graduated from Richwoods High School in Peoria, Illinois, as a three time all-state selection and the Gatorade Player of the Year for the Midwest in 1996. Robinson would score 2,944 career points and play in the McDonald's All-American game. 

Robinson attended Purdue University, when he played basketball on two Sweet 16 teams and one Elite 8 squad in March Madness during his four years. His college scoring total was 1,322.  After graduating from Purdue,  Robinson competed professionally both in the United States and Argentina. 

In 2018 Robinson won a state championship as a high school coach in Virginia, leading the South County Stallions to the Class 6 title. Robinson is married to Michelle Duhart who played for the 1999 champion Purdue women's basketball team.

References

1976 births
Living people
American expatriate basketball people in Argentina
American men's basketball players
Basketball players from Illinois
Guards (basketball)
High school basketball coaches in Virginia
Parade High School All-Americans (boys' basketball)
Purdue Boilermakers men's basketball players
Sportspeople from Peoria, Illinois